American pop singer Halsey has released four studio albums, one live album, 14 extended plays (including one standard EP, seven compilation EPs, five remix EPs, and two live session EPs), 24 singles (including three as a featured artist), nine promotional singles, and 33 music videos. After being signed to Astralwerks, she released her debut EP Room 93 on October 27, 2014, and then toured with larger acts to promote it and her upcoming album. Since her debut, Halsey has released nine Gold, 11 Platinum, seven Multiplatinum, and one Diamond single in the United States alone.

Shortly after making her debut, Halsey earned her first chart entry on the US Billboard Hot 100 songs chart with the single "New Americana", which reached number 60 and served as the lead single for her debut studio album Badlands (2015). Badlands debuted at number two on the Billboard 200 albums chart in the United States with 115,000 equivalent sales with also reaching to the top ten in Australia, Canada, the United Kingdom, and several other countries. Since its release it has been certified 2× Platinum in the US, Platinum in Canada and Norway, and Gold in Australia and Denmark. The album was followed by two more singles, "Colors", and a re-recorded version of the song "Castle" for the soundtrack of the 2016 film The Huntsman: Winter's War. The following year Halsey found extreme success as a featured vocalist on "Closer", a collaboration with The Chainsmokers. It topped the Billboard Hot 100 for 12 consecutive weeks while topping the charts of over 20 other countries, has sold more than 15 million units worldwide, and earned Halsey a Grammy Award nomination for Best Pop Duo/Group Performance.

Halsey's follow up album, Hopeless Fountain Kingdom (2017), debuted at number one in the US with 106,000 sales in its first week, becoming her first number one album. It additionally debuted at number one in Canada and reached the top ten in Australia, Ireland, and New Zealand and was certified Platinum in the US, Canada, and Norway, Gold in Denmark, and Silver in the UK. All of the album's singles charted in the US with its lead single, "Now or Never" reaching number 17, "Bad at Love" at number five, and "Alone" at number 66.

In July 2018, Halsey sang with Khalid on Benny Blanco's debut single "Eastside", which topped the charts of five countries and peaked at number nine in the US. It went on to spend over a year charting on the Hot 100 and has sold over three million units worldwide. In October of the same year, Halsey released "Without Me", which became one of her biggest songs to date, reaching the top three of several countries' music charts as well as topping the Billboard Hot 100 for two non-consecutive weeks. It has sold over 15 million units worldwide and ranked at number 12 on Billboard magazine's Decade End chart for the 2010s. It would later serve as the lead single for Halsey's third studio album, Manic (2020). Manic debuted at number two on the Billboard 200 with 239,000 in equivalent-album sales in its first week of release, making it the biggest album debut of Halsey's career. It also reached the top ten in Australia, Belgium, Canada, Ireland, New Zealand, and the UK. In the US, Manic became the most streamed female album of the year and the first Recording Industry Association of America (RIAA) certified Platinum album of 2020. The album was preceded by the release of the singles "Graveyard" and "You Should Be Sad", which peaked at number 34 and 26 in the US, respectively.

Albums

Studio albums

Live albums

Extended plays

Compilation extended plays

Remix extended plays

Live extended plays

Singles

As lead artist

As featured artist

Promotional singles

Other charted and certified songs

Other appearances

Music videos

•"*" denotes that the music video was originally featured in the If I Can't Have Love, I Want Power film.

Notes

References 

Discographies of American artists
Pop music discographies
Discography